Taugevatn (also called Tågavatni) is a lake on the south side of the Bergen Line in Ulvik municipality in Vestland county, Norway.

Taugevatn drains via Fagervatnet lake (at the same elevation) to the Ustekveikja river, which feeds Ustevatn lake in Hol Municipality in Buskerud.

See also
List of lakes in Norway

Notes

References

Lakes of Vestland
Ulvik